Kwamtoro is an administrative ward in the Chemba District of the Dodoma Region of Tanzania. It is made of six villages which are Kwamtoro, Msera, Banguma, Kurio, Ndoroboni and Mialo. In 2016 the Tanzania National Bureau of Statistics report there were 10,635 people in the ward, from 9,785 in 2012.

References

Wards of Dodoma Region